The Gozo Channel is short stretch of Mediterranean Sea separating the Maltese island of Gozo from the northern tip of Malta.

At the centre of the channel are the two islands of Comino (inhabited) and Cominotto. The channel serves as a sea route link between the two islands with a ferry service run by Gozo Channel Line running all year round from the ports of Mġarr Harbour and Ċirkewwa.

References

Channels of the Mediterranean Sea
Bodies of water of Malta
Gozo
Coasts of Malta
Channels of Europe
Gozo Channel